Hosle is a district in the municipality of Bærum, Norway. Its population (as of 2007) is 5,713.

Bus Routes to Hosle
140 Bekkestua-Skøyen
140E Hosle-Nationaltheatret
212 Bekkestua-Bekkestua

References

Villages in Akershus
Bærum